Dön Ne Olur (Please Come Back) is the sixth studio album of Ebru Gündeş, the Turkish pop-folk, actress, and television personality. The album was released in 1999.

Track listing

References

1999 albums
Ebru Gündeş albums